The Madame Blanc Mysteries is a cosy crime drama television series, produced by Saffron Cherry Productions, that is broadcast on Channel 5 and Acorn TV. The series, written by and starring Sally Lindsay and Sue Vincent, concerns a Cheshire antiques dealer, Jean White, who helps solve an array of mysteries and deaths in the fictional village of Sainte Victoire in the South of France. The series premiered on 16 October 2021, and boasts Robin Askwith, Steve Edge and Sue Holderness amongst the supporting cast.

Following broadcast, the series became one of the most popular new shows on Channel 5, with episodes averaging around 2.5 million viewers. The first series was also released on DVD on 13 December 2021. The series' signature theme, “Passing Through”, was written specificially for the show by Lindsay's husband Steve White.

Plot
Successful antiques dealer husband and wife Jean and Rory White (Sally Lindsay and Peter Gaynor) live in a sleepy village in Cheshire, England, but owne a cottage in the village of Sainte Victoire in the South of France. When Rory is killed in a car crash in Saint Victoire, Jean realises all her assets have been pawned off, leaving her penniless. She then travels to France to unravel the mystery of her husband's death, his missing valuable ring, and the identity of the woman with whom her husband was having an affair; solving other mysteries along the way with the help of local taxi driver Dom (Steve Edge), local chateau owners Judith and Jeremy (Sue Holderness and Robin Askwith) and the local Chief of Police, Caron (Alex Gaumond).

Each episode features its own individual mystery; and several guest stars to boot, with the likes of Paul O'Grady, Tony Robinson and Les Dennis all appearing in one-off roles.

Production
The series was officially announced in January 2021 under the title The Reluctant Madame Blanc. with casting released later in the year. Although set in the South of France, the series was actually filmed in Gozo.

Cast
 Sally Lindsay as Jean White; an antiques dealer and amateur slueth.
 Steve Edge as Dom Hayes; a local taxi driver.
 Sue Holderness as Judith Lloyd James; lady of the manor.
 Robin Askwith as Jeremy Lloyd James; Judith's husband.
 Alex Gaumond as Inspecteur André Caron; chief of local police.
 Sue Vincent as Gloria Beauchamp; a local garage owner.
 Aonghus Weber as Niall Connor; owner of the local bar.
 Margeaux Lampley as Celine Connor; Niall's wife.
 Olivia Caffrey as Barbara; a mysterious figure who is out to get Jean.
 Jacqueline Berces as Gendarme Richárd; Inspectuer Caron's subordinate. 
 Sanchia McCormack as Charlie Brodeur; co-owner of a local antiques business.
 Djinda Kane as Simone Brodeur; Charlie's wife.
 Narayan David Hecter as Xavier Beauchamp (Series 1); Gloria's son.
 Alaïs Lawson as Claudette Hayes (Series 1); Dom's daughter.
 Avant Strangel as Cooper McGraw (Series 2); A love interest for Gloria.
 Paul Chuckle as Trevor Beauchamp; Gloria's father.

Episodes

Series 1 (2021)

Series 2 (2022–23)

References

External links
 
 

2021 British television series debuts
2020s British drama television series
2020s British mystery television series
Channel 5 (British TV channel) original programming
English-language television shows